This is a list of player transfers involving Top 14 teams before or during the 2020–21 season. The list is of deals that are confirmed and are either from or to a rugby union team in the Top 14 during the 2019-20 season. It is not unknown for confirmed deals to be cancelled at a later date.

Agen

Players In
 Jean-Marcellin Buttin from  Lyon
 Tapu Falatea from  Castres
 Nathan Decron promoted from Academy
 Corentin Vernet from  Toulon
 Camille Gerondeau from  Castres
 Victor Moreaux from  Castres
 Kevin Yaméogo from  Lyon (season-long loan)
 Tevita Railevu from  La Rochelle
 Yoan Cottin from  Toulon (season-long loan)
 Noel Reid from  Leicester Tigers
 Gabriel Ibitoye from  Harlequins
 Paterika Vaivai from  Toulouse Olympique

Players Out
 Mickaël De Marco retired
 Alban Conduche to  Dijon
 Leo Berdeu returned to  Lyon
 Tom Murday to  Toyota Industries Shuttles 
 Kamliele Tufele to  Montauban
 Benito Masilevu to  Grenoble
 Jeronimo Negrotto to  Nice
 Xavier Chauveau retired
 Adrian Motoc to  Massy
 Gabriel Ibitoye to  Montpellier 
 Paul Ngauamo to  Castres

Bayonne

Players In
 Asier Usarraga from  Biarritz
 Gaëtan Germain from  Grenoble
 Joe Ravouvou from  New Zealand Sevens
 Sam Nixon from  Bath
 John Ulugia from  Clermont
 Hugh Pyle from  Stade Francais
 Izaia Perese from  Brisbane Broncos
 Alexandre Manukula from  Toulouse (season-long loan)
 Konstantin Mikautadze from  Montpellier 
 Afa Amosa from  Bordeaux

Players Out
 Jose Ramon Ayerza to  Montauban
 Callum Wilson to  Biarritz
 Evrard Oulai Dion to  Montauban
 Maxime Lamothe returned to  Bordeaux
 Antoine Battut retired
 Julien Tisseron to  Montpellier
 Maile Mamao to  Rovigo
 Census Johnston retired
 Aretz Iguiniz retired
 Benjamin Collet to  Valence Romans
 Emmanuel Saubusse to  Mont-de-Marsan
 P. J. van Lill to  Valence Romans
 Adam Jaulhac released
 Armandt Koster released
 Edwin Maka released

Bordeaux

Players In
 Joseph Dweba from  Cheetahs
 Ben Lam from  Hurricanes
 Nathaniel Hulleu from  Grenoble
 Ben Tameifuna from  Racing 92
 Maxime Lamothe returned from  Bayonne
 Guido Petti from  Jaguares
 Pablo Uberti returned from  Grenoble
 Bautista Delguy from  Jaguares

Players Out
 Adrien Pélissié to  Clermont
 Semi Radradra to  Bristol Bears
 Peni Ravai to  Clermont
 Lucas Meret to  Carcassonne
 Florian Dufour to  Brive
 Blair Connor retired
 Masalosalo Tutaia released
 Nicolas Plazy to  Beziers
 Seta Tamanivalu to  Toshiba Brave Lupus 
 Afa Amosa to  Bayonne

Brive

Players In
 Wesley Douglas from  Beziers
 Valentin Tirefort from  La Rochelle
 Pietro Ceccarelli from  Edinburgh
 Florian Dufour from  Bordeaux
 Setariki Tuicuvu from  Clermont
 Brandon Nansen from  Dragons
 Stan South from  Exeter Chiefs
 Daniel Brennan from  Montpellier season-long loan
 Badri Alkhazashvili from  Lyon season-long loan
 Lucas Paulos from  Jaguares

Players Out
 Johan Snyman retired
 François Da Ros to  Biarritz
 James Johnston to  Rouen
 Alex Dunbar released
 Franck Romanet released
 Rory Scholes released
 Richard Fourcade to  Le Seyne
 Guillaume Namy to  Narbonne
 Karlen Asieshvili to  Rouen
 Jan Uys to  Bulls
 Dan Malafosse released
 Alban Ramette to  Aubenas

Castres

Players In
 Julius Nostadt from  Aurillac
 Bastien Guillemin from  Grenoble
 Santiago Arata from  Peñarol
 Adrea Cocagi from  Perpignan
 Stéphane Onambélé from  Toulon
 Gaëtan Barlot from  Colomiers
 Tyler Ardron from  Chiefs
 Kevin Kornath from  Montpellier
 Vilimoni Botitu from  Fiji Sevens
 Ryno Pieterse from  Bulls
 Pierre Huguet from  Carcassonne
 Florent Vanverberghe from  Toulon
 Osea Waqaninavatu from  Fijian Drua
 Tom Staniforth from  NSW Waratahs
 Paul Ngauamo from  Agen

Players Out
 Ludovic Radosavljevic to  Provence
 Karena Wihongi retired
 Tapu Falatea to  Agen
 Christophe Samson retired
 Kevin Gimeno to  Biarritz
 Rodrigo Capo Ortega retired
 Camille Gerondeau to  Agen
 Jody Jenneker to  Valence Romans
 Morgan Phelipponneau to  Vannes
 Victor Moreaux to  Agen
 Julien Caminati to  Montauban
 Paul Sauzaret to  Bourg-en-Bresse
 Marc Clerc retired
 Taylor Paris to  Oyonnax
 Paea Faʻanunu released
 Benjamin Lapeyre released
 Alex Tulou to  Lyon
 Robert Ebersohn to  Beziers 
 Semi Kunatani released

Clermont

Players In
 Adrien Pélissié from  Bordeaux
 Cristian Ojovan from  Aurillac
 Sébastien Bézy from  Toulouse
 Peni Ravai from  Bordeaux
 Etienne Fourcade from  Grenoble
 Kotaro Matsushima from  Suntory Sungoliath
 Bastien Pourailly from  Pau
 Tavite Veredamu from  France Sevens (medical joker) 
 Jean-Pascal Barraque from  France Sevens 
 Rory Jennings from  Coventry

Players Out
 Marc Palmier to  Aurillac
 Davit Zirakashvili retired
 Donovan Taofifenua to  Racing 92
 John Ulugia to  Bayonne
 Charlie Cassang to  Oyonnax
 Mike Tadjer to  Montauban
 Beka Kakabadze to  Oyonnax
 Julien Ruaud to  Grenoble
 Remy Grosso to  Lyon
 Setariki Tuicuvu to  Brive
 Isaia Toeava to  Toulon
 Greig Laidlaw to  NTT Communications Shining Arcs
 Nick Abendanon to  Vannes
 Loni Uhila to  La Rochelle 
 George Merrick to  Worcester Warriors
 Jake McIntyre to  Western Force
 Sitaleki Timani to  Western Force

La Rochelle

Players In
 Brice Dulin from  Racing 92
 Raymond Rhule from  Grenoble
 Jules Le Bail from  Vannes
 Dillyn Leyds from  Stormers
 Will Skelton from  Saracens
 Loni Uhila from  Clermont
 Darren Sweetnam from  Munster (short-term deal)
 Marcel van der Merwe from  Bulls (short-term deal)

Players Out
 Vincent Rattez to  Montpellier
 Elliott Roudil to  Pau
 Maxime Lafage to  Bayonne
 Valentin Tirefort to  Brive
 Brock James retired
 Alexi Balès to  Toulouse
 Thomas Jolmes to  Toulon
 Marc Andreu to  La Seyne
 Brieuc Plessis-Couillard to  Biarritz
 Jone Qovu to  Niort
 Tevita Railevu to  Agen
 Mike Corbel to  Provence
 Sila Puafisi released
 Kini Murimurivalu to  Leicester Tigers
 Jean-Charles Orioli to  Grenoble

Lyon

Players In
 Colby Fainga'a from  Connacht
 Joe Taufete'e from  Worcester Warriors
 Leo Berdeu returned from  Agen
 Mathieu Bastareaud from  Rugby United New York
 Remy Grosso from  Clermont
 Gillian Galan from  Toulouse
 Izack Rodda from  Queensland Reds
 Alex Tulou from  Castres
 Temo Mayanavanua from  Northland (season-long loan)
 Jordan Taufua from  Leicester Tigers

Players Out
 Julien Puricelli retired
 Jean-Marcellin Buttin to  Agen
 Sam Hidalgo-Clyne to  Exeter Chiefs
 Tanginoa Halaifonua to  Grenoble
 Martial Rolland to  Aurillac
 Liam Gill to  NTT Communications Shining Arcs
 Carl Fearns to  Rouen
 Hendrik Roodt retired
 Kevin Yaméogo to  Agen (season-long loan)
 Alexis Palisson to  Colomiers
 Badri Alkhazashvili to  Brive (season-long loan)
 Patricio Fernández to  Perpignan

Montpellier

Players In
 Vincent Rattez from  La Rochelle
 Florian Verhaeghe from  Toulouse
 Julien Tisseron from  Bayonne
 Titi Lamositele from  Saracens
 Enzo Forletta from  Perpignan
 Alexandre Becognee from  Mont-de-Marsan
 Mickaël Capelli from  Grenoble
 Alex Lozowski from  Saracens (season-long loan)
 Cobus Reinach from  Northampton Saints
 Gabriel Ibitoye from  Agen

Players Out
 Julien Bardy retired
 Ronan Chambord to  Langon
 Pierre Tournebize to  Brive
 Timoci Nagusa to  Grenoble
 Julien Le Devedec to  Provence
 Nemani Nadolo to  Leicester Tigers
 François Steyn to  Cheetahs
 Kevin Kornath to  Castres
 Kahn Fotuali'i retired
 Enzo Sanga to  Valence Romans
 Lucas de Conninick to  Provence
 Valentin Seille to  Dijon
 Konstantin Mikautadze to  Bayonne
 Benjamin Fall to  Oyonnax
 Daniel Brennan to  Brive season-long loan

Pau

Players In
 Elliott Roudil from  La Rochelle
 Aminiasi Tuimaba from  Fiji Sevens
 Tumua Manu from  Chiefs
 Matt Philip from  Melbourne Rebels
 Mike Harris from  Toshiba Brave Lupus
 Hugo Bonneval from  Toulon
 Steve Cummins from  Scarlets (medical joker)
 Maks van Dyk from  Exeter Chiefs (short-term deal) 
 Elton Jantjies from  Lions (short-term deal)

Players Out
 Benson Stanley to  Montauban
 Mathias Colombet to  France Sevens
 Bastien Pourailly to  Clermont
 Dominiko Waqaniburotu released
 Colin Slade to  Mitsubishi Dynaboars
 Pierre Nueno to  Narbonne 
 Ben Smith to  Kobelco Steelers
 Tom Taylor to  Toshiba Brave Lupus 
 Marvin Lestremau to  Auch

Racing 92

Players In
 Donovan Taofifenua from  Clermont
 Kurtley Beale from  NSW Waratahs
 Luke Jones from  Melbourne Rebels
 Emiliano Boffelli from  Jaguares
 Gaël Fickou from  Stade Français

Players Out
 Johnny Dyer to  Biarritz
 Brice Dulin to  La Rochelle
 Issam Hamel to  Nevers
 Vasil Kakovin to  Stade Francais
 Ben Volavola to  Perpignan
 Ben Tameifuna to  Bordeaux
 Ewan Johnson to  Vannes

Stade Français

Players In
 Vasil Kakovin from  Racing 92
 Marcos Kremer from  Jaguares
 Gerbrandt Grobler from  Gloucester
 Telusa Veainu from  Leicester Tigers
 Dylan Smith from  Lions

Players Out
 Julien Arias retired
 Remi Bonfils retired
 Hugh Pyle to  Bayonne
 Thierry Futeu to  Carcassonne
 Joketani Koroi to  Nice
 Lionel Mapoe to  Nice
 Alexis Palisson to  Colomiers
 Sione Anga'aellangi released
 Ruan Combrinck released
 Clément Daguin released
 Gaël Fickou to  Racing 92

Toulon

Players In
 Thomas Jolmes from  La Rochelle
 Jeremy Boyadjis from  Rennes
 Isaia Toeava from  Clermont
 Harrison Obatoyinbo from  Ealing Trailfinders
 Ma'a Nonu from  San Diego Legion (season-long loan)
 Adrien Warion from  Provence 
 Levi Douglas from  Wasps (short-term deal)

Players Out
 Stéphane Onambélé to  Castres
 Corentin Vernet to  Agen
 Mamuka Gorgodze retired
 Marcel van der Merwe to  Bulls
 Mathieu Smaili to  Mont-de-Marsan
 Nehe Milner-Skudder to  Highlanders
 Florent Vanverberghe to  Castres
 Yoan Cottin to  Agen (season-long loan)
 Makalea Foliaki to  Cognac 
 Hugo Bonneval to  Pau
 Liam Messam to  Waikato 
 Julian Savea to  Hurricanes
 Bryce Heem to  Blues

Toulouse

Players In
 Alexi Balès from  La Rochelle
 Richie Arnold from  Yamaha Júbilo
 Thibaud Flament from  Wasps
 Juan Cruz Mallía from  Jaguares
 Santiago Chocobares from  Jaguares XV

Players Out
 Sébastien Bézy to  Clermont
 Florian Verhaeghe to  Montpellier
 Théo Belan to  Provence
 Richie Gray to  Glasgow Warriors
 Carl Axtens to  Provence
 Pierre Pagès to  Vannes
 Gillian Galan to  Lyon
 Alexandre Manukula to  Bayonne (season-long loan)
 Tristan Tedder to  Béziers (season-long loan)
 Maxime Mermoz retired''

See also
List of 2020–21 Premiership Rugby transfers
List of 2020–21 Pro14 transfers
List of 2020–21 Super Rugby transfers
List of 2020–21 RFU Championship transfers
List of 2020–21 Major League Rugby transfers

References

2019-20
2020–21 Top 14 season